Lamoka may refer to:

 Lamoka site, historical landmark in New York state
 Lamoka Lake, formerly Mud Lake, lake in New York state